Onpassive (Al Safa, Noor Bank, Noor Islamic Bank and Al Quoz) is a rapid transit station on the Red Line of the Dubai Metro in Dubai, UAE, serving Al Quoz and surrounding areas.

The station, first named "Al Quoz", opened as part of the Red Line on 15 May 2010 as "Noor Bank", and was renamed to "Al Safa" on November 24, 2020, then Onpassive on January 11, 2023. It is located on the Sheikh Zayed Road near the major junction with Al Manara Street. Nearby are Al Quoz Bus Station, Kite Beach, Oasis Mall, and the Times Square Centre. As well as Al Quoz, surrounding neighbourhoods include the eponymous Al Safa itself and Umm Suqeim. The station is close to a number of bus routes.

Al Safa Metro station will rebranded as Onpassive Metro Station for 10 years until 2033.

References

Railway stations in the United Arab Emirates opened in 2010
Dubai Metro stations